The seventeenth Royal Navy vessel to be named HMS Dolphin was the Royal Naval shore establishment sited at Fort Blockhouse in Gosport. Dolphin was the home of the Royal Navy Submarine Service from 1904 to 1999, and location of the Royal Navy Submarine School.

Closure of submarine base 
HMS Dolphin closed as a submarine base on 30 September 1998, although the last RN submarine permanently based at Gosport was HMS Ursula which had left 4 years earlier in 1994.  The Royal Navy Submarine School (RNSMS) remained at Dolphin until 23 December 1999 when it closed prior to relocation to HMS Raleigh at Torpoint in Cornwall. The RNSMS staff marched into HMS Raleigh and were welcomed on board by Commodore Lockwood on 31 January 2000. The RNSMS is located in the Dolphin and Astute blocks at Raleigh, although the Submarine Escape Training Tank (SETT), a 30m deep tank of water used to instruct all RN submariners in pressurised escape, remains at the same site, now renamed Fort Blockhouse.

Submarine museum 
The Royal Navy Submarine Museum is still sited nearby on Haslar Jetty Road next to Fort Blockhouse and Royal Naval Hospital Haslar.

External links
 Royal Navy Submarine School (RNSMS)
 Royal Navy Submarine Museum 

Ports and harbours of Hampshire
Gosport
Royal Navy Submarine Service